The Seedorf family is a Dutch family of Surinamese origin which has produced a number of association football players and agents.

Members
Johann Seedorf was a football player and agent, who had three sons - Clarence, Jürgen and Chedric. Stefano and Rahmlee Seedorf are their cousins.

Clarence's nephew Collin is also a footballer.

Regilio Seedorf is a relative of the family, as is Sherwin Seedorf.

References

 
Dutch families
Surinamese families